Peter Smrek (born 16 February 1979) is a Slovak former professional ice hockey defenceman who played 28 games in the National Hockey League (NHL) between the St. Louis Blues and New York Rangers.

Playing career

Amateur
Smrek played for the Des Moines Buccaneers of the United States Hockey League (USHL) during the 1998–99 season and helped them win the 1999 Clark Cup Championship.

Professional
Smrek was drafted 85th overall by the St. Louis Blues in the 1999 NHL Entry Draft, and made his NHL debut on February 10, 2001 against the Colorado Avalanche. but only managed to play 6 games with the Blues, spending most of his time with the Blues' American Hockey League affiliate the Worcester IceCats.  He was later traded to the New York Rangers and played 22 further games in the NHL, but again spent most of his spell in the AHL, this time with the Hartford Wolf Pack.  He was then traded to the Nashville Predators and then to the Ottawa Senators, but never played another NHL game.  In total, Smrek played 28 NHL games, scoring two goals and four assists for 6 points and collected 18 penalty minutes.

In 2004, Smrek moved to Germany and signed for the Wolfsburg Grizzly Adams where he scored 13 goals and 14 assists for 27 points and was the Grizzly Adams' top scoring defenceman.  However the Grizzly Adams were relegated from the DEL and as a result, Smrek was on the move again.  Smrek signed on with Mora IK of Sweden's Elitserien where he only managed to score 6 goals and 13 assists for 19 points. After one season in Sweden, Smrek returned to Germany and signed for the Frankfurt Lions. He moved on 14 October 2008 from Frankfurt Lions to Czech Extraliga club HC Lasselsberger Plzeň and than on 30 May 2009 further to Severstal Cherepovets.

After a three year hiatus from professional hockey, Smrek returned to play two seasons with hometown club, MHC Martin of the Slovak Extraliga, from the 2013–14 season.

Career statistics

Regular season and playoffs

International

Awards and honours

Transactions
March 5, 2001 - Traded by the St. Louis Blues to the New York Rangers in exchange for Alexei Gusarov
March 19, 2002 - Traded by the New York Rangers to the Nashville Predators in exchange for Richard Lintner
June 6, 2003 - Traded by the Nashville Predators to the Ottawa Senators in exchange for Chris Bala

References

External links
 

1979 births
Binghamton Senators players
Frankfurt Lions players
Hartford Wolf Pack players
Severstal Cherepovets players
Living people
MHC Martin players
Milwaukee Admirals players
Mora IK players
New York Rangers players
Olympic ice hockey players of Slovakia
Ice hockey players at the 2002 Winter Olympics
Sportspeople from Martin, Slovakia
Peoria Rivermen (ECHL) players
HC Plzeň players
Slovak ice hockey defencemen
St. Louis Blues draft picks
St. Louis Blues players
Grizzlys Wolfsburg players
Worcester IceCats players
Slovak expatriate ice hockey players in the United States
Slovak expatriate ice hockey players in the Czech Republic
Slovak expatriate ice hockey players in Germany
Slovak expatriate ice hockey players in Sweden
Slovak expatriate ice hockey players in Russia